Insch railway station is a railway station serving the village of Insch, Aberdeenshire, Scotland. The station is managed by ScotRail and is on the Aberdeen to Inverness Line, between Inverurie and Huntly,  from Aberdeen.

History

In 2019, the platforms were extended to a length of 160m as part of a series of improvements to the Aberdeen to Inverness line.

Facilities 
The station building accommodates the Insch Connection Museum, which records the history of the railway in Insch and the local region. The station has two platforms, a signal box and a level crossing at its northern end. Both platforms are equipped with waiting rooms and benches. A help point is located on platform 2, whilst there is a ticket machine on platform 1, the latter of which is adjacent to the car park and some bike racks. Only platform 1 has step-free access - a footbridge connects the two platforms, and is the only way to get to platform 2.

Passenger volume 
As of July 2021, It is the least used station in Aberdeenshire and the least used station on the Aberdeen-Inverness line.

The statistics cover twelve month periods that start in April.

Services

There is a basic two-hourly frequency in each directions (with peak extras), to  via  northbound and  southbound (12 trains southbound, 11 northbound). The first departure to Aberdeen each weekday and Saturday continues south to Edinburgh Waverley, and another continues to Stonehaven in the evening. On Sundays there are five trains each way.

References

Bibliography

External links 

 Insch Connection Museum

Railway stations in Aberdeenshire
Railway stations served by ScotRail
Railway stations in Great Britain opened in 1854
Railway museums in Scotland
Museums in Aberdeenshire
Former Great North of Scotland Railway stations
1854 establishments in Scotland